John Fitzgerald   was an Anglican priest in the  17th century.

Fitzgerald was born in Cork and educated at Trinity College, Dublin.  He was Archdeacon of Dublin from 1675 until his resignation in 1689.

Notes 

Clergy from Cork (city)
17th-century Irish Anglican priests
Alumni of Trinity College Dublin
Archdeacons of Dublin